Moisés Rodrigues Duque (born 21 December 1988 in São José dos Campos) is a Brazilian rugby union player. He plays as a centre.

He played for São José Rugby Clube in the Campeonato Brasileiro de Rugby. He played briefly for Blagnac at the Fédérale 1 of the French Rugby, in 2012/13. He returned afterwards to São José Rugby Club.

He has 18 caps for Brazil, since his first game at 2013, with 4 try, 18 conversions, 20 penalties and 2 drop goals scored, 122 points on aggregate. He scored a conversion and four penalties in the historical 24-23 win over United States at 27 February 2016, in the first edition of the 2016 Americas Rugby Championship. It was the first time the "Tupis" faced the United States and was also the first win of Brazil over a second tier rugby team.

He is also an important player for the sevens national team side.

References

External links
 
 

1988 births
Living people
Brazilian rugby union players
Rugby union centres
People from São José dos Campos
Brazilian expatriate rugby union players
Brazilian expatriate sportspeople in France
Expatriate rugby union players in France
Olympic rugby sevens players of Brazil
Brazil international rugby sevens players
Rugby sevens players at the 2016 Summer Olympics
Rugby sevens players at the 2015 Pan American Games
Rugby sevens players at the 2019 Pan American Games
Pan American Games competitors for Brazil
Cobras Brasil XV players
Brazilian rugby sevens players
Sportspeople from São Paulo (state)
Brazil international rugby union players
21st-century Brazilian people